Lupinoblennius nicholsi, the highfin blenny, is a species of combtooth blenny found in the western Atlantic ocean, on the coasts of the Gulf of Mexico in north-eastern Mexico and Texas, it has also been recorded from Englewood, Florida.  This species reaches a length of  TL. The specific name honours the American ichthyologist John Treadwell Nichols (1883-1958).

References

nicholsi
Fish described in 1954